Aleksandr Vladimirovich Kovalyov (born March 2, 1975) is a Russian sprint canoeist who has competed from 1997 to 2005.

Having just missed out on a medal at the Sydney Olympics, he and partner Aleksandr Kostoglod won two medals at Athens in 2004 with a silver in the C-2 1000 m and bronze C-2 500 m events.

Kovalev also won six medals at the ICF Canoe Sprint World Championships with three golds (C-2 1000 m: 1998, 1999; C-4 200 m: 2005), one silver (C-2 1000 m: 2003), and two bronzes (C-2 500 m: 1999, C-4 200 m: 2001).

References

External links
 
 

1975 births
Canoeists at the 2000 Summer Olympics
Canoeists at the 2004 Summer Olympics
Living people
Olympic canoeists of Russia
Olympic silver medalists for Russia
Olympic bronze medalists for Russia
Russian male canoeists
People from Belaya Kalitva
Olympic medalists in canoeing
ICF Canoe Sprint World Championships medalists in Canadian
Medalists at the 2004 Summer Olympics
Sportspeople from Rostov Oblast